The 2006 Deutsche Tourenwagen Masters was the twentieth season of premier German touring car championship and also seventh season under the moniker of Deutsche Tourenwagen Masters since the series was resumed in 2000. The number of race weekends was reduced, from eleven in 2005, to ten for the 2006 season. Each track hosted one race, with the exception of Hockenheim, which hosted two. As in 2005, each event consisted of one race of approximately one hour, with two compulsory pit stops for each car. The Championship was won by Bernd Schneider driving an AMG-Mercedes C-Klasse 2006 for the HWA Team. Team Rosberg returned to the series after one-year absence and thus switched to Audi Sport machinery.

Changes for 2006
 Opel exited the series, leaving Audi and Mercedes as remaining manufacturers. Audi and Mercedes respectively increased their number of entries from eight to ten cars each to fill up the four empty spots left by Opel.
 Older 2004 models became cheaper, allowing privateer teams to buy them.
 The rounds in Belgium at Spa-Francorchamps and Turkey at Istanbul Park were dropped in favour of Le Mans in France and Barcelona in Spain.
 The round in Czech Republic at Brno were removed from the schedule.

Teams and drivers
The following manufacturers, teams and drivers competed in the 2006 Deutsche Tourenwagen Masters. All teams competed with tyres supplied by Dunlop.

* Olivier Tielemans was replaced by Jeroen Bleekemolen
** Jeroen Bleekemolen was replaced by Nicolas Kiesa after problems between the team of Colin Kolles where he drove and the main sponsor of Bleekemolen
*** Nicolas Kiesa was replaced by Thed Björk after being injured in a motocross accident

Race calendar and winners

Championship standings

Scoring system
Points are awarded to the top 8 classified finishers.

Drivers' championship

† — Driver retired, but was classified as they completed 90% of the winner's race distance.

Teams' championship

External links

 Official DTM website

Deutsche Tourenwagen Masters seasons
Deutsche Tourenwagen Masters